The Mailman is a 1923 American silent drama film directed by Emory Johnson and written by Emilie Johnson. The film stars Ralph Lewis and Johnnie Walker. The film was released on December 9, 1923 by FBO.

Plot
This story unfolds as a veteran postman Bob Morley played by Ralph Lewis and his son - Johnnie played by Johnnie Walker are both honored for their years of service.  Later, Johnnie receives a promotion to work on a postal service ship, the Enterprise.  The ocean-going ship carries registered postal mail.  One night while Johnnie is at work on the ship, a robbery occurs at midnight. During the burglary, the robbers kill a postal officer.  Bob's son witnesses the foul play.  The perpetrators decide to throw Johnnie, the only witness, overboard into the sea.

After Johnnie is tossed overboard, he is recovered by a yacht, which happens to be in the area.  In a twist of fate, the vessel is a rum-runner and happens to be involved in the robbery of the Enterprise.  Johnnie somehow alerts the Pacific fleet.  The entire Pacific fleet pursues the rum-running yacht with ten Dreadnoughts.  The warships destroy the 90-foot yacht.  Johnnie is saved from the destruction only to face trial for killing a government postal officer during the robbery.  His father desperately contacts everyone he knows, pleading to save his son. As the court is about to sentenced Johnnie to hang for the shooting, the real perpetrator confesses, and all ends well.

Cast
{| 
! style="width: 190px; text-align: left;"|Actor
! style="width: 150px; text-align: left;"|Role
|- style="text-align: left;"
|Ralph Lewis||Bob Morley
|-
|Johnnie Walker||Johnnie
|-
|Martha Sleeper||Betty
|-
|Virginia True Boardman||Mrs. Morley
|-
|Taylor Graves||Harry
|-
|Hardee Kirkland||Captain Franz
|-
|David Kirby||Jack Morgan
|-
|Josephine Adair||Virginia
|-
|Rosemary Cooper||Mrs. Thompson
|-
|Richard Morris||Admiral Fleming
|-
|}

Preservation status
A report created by film historian and archivist David Pierce for the Library of Congress claims:
75% of original silent-era films have perished.
14% of the 10,919 silent films released by major studios exist in their original 35mm or other formats.
11% survive in full-length foreign versions or on film formats of lesser image quality. Many silent-era films did not survive for reasons as explained on this Wikipedia page.

Emory Johnson directed 13 films, of which 11 were silent, and 2 were Talkies. The Mailman was the fourth film in Emory Johnson's eight-picture contract with FBO. The film's original length is listed at 7 reels. According to the Library of Congress website, this film has a status of - 2 reels are available at the Gosfilmofond of Russia (Moscow)

Copies of this movie are not available on YouTube, movie vendors, or the Internet Archive.

Gallery

References

External links

1923 adventure films
1920s romance films
1923 films
1923 drama films
American action adventure films
American adventure films
American black-and-white films
American crime drama films
American crime thriller films
American romance films
American romantic drama films
American silent feature films
1920s English-language films
Film Booking Offices of America films
Lost American films
Melodrama films
Films directed by Emory Johnson
1920s American films
Silent romantic drama films
Silent adventure films
Silent thriller films
Silent American drama films